Qurna may refer to;

 Kurna, three village areas near the Theban Hills in Egypt
 al-Qurnah, a city in Iraq
 Battle of Qurna, fought in, Qurna, Iraq
 Lake Kournas, a village and a lake in Crete, Greece
 West Qurna Field, an oil field near Qurna, Iraq